Ocotea catharinensis is a member of the plant family Lauraceae. It is a slow-growing evergreen, a valuable hardwood tree of broad ecological importance, and it is threatened by habitat loss and by overexploitation for its timber and essential oils.

Distribution
The tree is endemic to southeastern Brazil in the Atlantic Forest ecoregion.

It is found in Paraná, Rio de Janeiro Rio Grande do Sul, Santa Catarina, and São Paulo states.

It can be a dominant canopy tree in the tropical rainforests of these states.

Description
Ocotea catharinensis is a slow-growing monoecious evergreen hardwood up to 40m tall. Its flowers are small and hermaphrodite. The ovary is glabrous with a well developed ovule. Often not all the locelli are fertile.

It is a honey-bearing tree and its fruits are eaten by birds and mammals, including the endangered monkey Brachyteles arachnoides.

Uses
The tree is badly overexploited for its valuable hardwood, its essential oils with their (linalool) content, and for various pharmaceutical compounds or prospects such as neolignans. From the early- to mid-20th century the wood was popular for the flooring of houses in the Brazilian coastal State of Santa Catarina.

Conservation
In 1997 it appeared in the IUCN Red List as a Vulnerable species, which it retains currently. Since then it has been described as "on the verge of extinction" and research is being published on prospects for its somatic propagation.

References

Further reading
 Irgang, B. E; Backes, Paulo. Mata Atlântica. As Árvores e a Paisagem. 1. ed. Porto Alegre: Paisagem do Sul, 2004. 393 p.
 Klein, R.M. Ecologia da flora e vegetação do Vale do Itajaí. Sellowia, 30 e 31. 1979–1980.
 Reitz,R.; Klein,R.M.; Reis,A. Projeto Madeira de Santa Catarina. 1978. 320 p.

External links

catharinensis
Endemic flora of Brazil
Flora of the Atlantic Forest
Trees of Brazil
Flora of Paraná (state)
Flora of Rio de Janeiro (state)
Flora of Rio Grande do Sul
Flora of Santa Catarina (state)
Flora of São Paulo (state)
Vulnerable flora of South America
Taxonomy articles created by Polbot